Sodium/potassium-transporting ATPase subunit alpha-3 is an enzyme that in humans is encoded by the ATP1A3 gene.

Function 

The protein encoded by this gene belongs to the family of P-type cation transport ATPases, and to the subfamily of Na+/K+-ATPases. Na+/K+-ATPase is an integral membrane protein responsible for establishing and maintaining the electrochemical gradients of Na and K ions across the plasma membrane. These gradients are essential for osmoregulation, for sodium-coupled transport of a variety of organic and inorganic molecules, and for electrical excitability of nerve and muscle. This enzyme is composed of two subunits, a large catalytic subunit (alpha) and a smaller glycoprotein subunit (beta). The catalytic subunit of Na+/K+-ATPase is encoded by multiple genes. This gene encodes an alpha 3 subunit. ATP1A3 is expressed early in human development, likely underlying pathophysiology related to several ATP1A3 related diseases.

Clinical significance 

Disease causing variants of the ATP1A3 gene are known to cause a variety of movement disorders and epilepsies. The known associations include a variety of syndromes, in approximate order of presentation:

 Malformation of Cortex Development, including polymicrogyria
 Developmental and epileptic encephalopathy
 Alternating hemiplegia of childhood (AHC)
 Cerebellar ataxia, Areflexia, Pes cavus, Optic atrophy and Sensorineural hearing loss (CAPOS/CAOS syndrome)
 Very early-onset schizophrenia
 Rapid-onset dystonia parkinsonism (RDP, also known as DYT12)
  Fever-induced paroxysmal weakness and encephalopathy (FIPWE)
 Recurrent episodes of cerebellar ataxia (RECA)

In mice, mutations in this gene are associated with epilepsy. By manipulating this gene in the offspring of such mice, epilepsy can be avoided.

References

Further reading

External links 
GeneReview/NCBI/NIH/UW entry on Rapid-Onset Dystonia Parkinsonism